Adopted Daughter was a radio soap opera in the United States. It premiered in 1937 on station WOW in Omaha, Nebraska, and moved to NBC's Midwest regional network in 1939. It was broadcast there five times a week for two years. The show was sponsored by J. C. Penney. Billboard magazine noted that the program was J.C. Penney's "first use of radio on a national basis." After 26 successful weeks on WOW, the program would be carried on 16 stations via transcription.

Plot 
Based on a series of skits called The Jangles, the story of Adopted Daughter centered on Jerry Jangles, a "courageous young wife who fights for home and happiness."

Cast 

The cast included Jettabee Ann Hopkins (who also wrote the program) and Alan Bunce. The announcer was Art Miller.

References

External links
Log of selected episodes of Adopted Daughter from RadioGOLDINdex
Streaming episodes of Adopted Daughter from Old Time Radio Researchers Group Library

American radio soap operas
1937 radio programme debuts
1930s American radio programs
1940s American radio programs
American radio dramas
NBC radio programs